Petrus Antonius "Peter" Lankhorst (born 1 January 1947) is a retired Dutch politician of the GreenLeft (GL) party and political consultant.

Lankhorst served as a Member of the House of Representatives from 10 June 1981 until 17 May 1994, first as a member of the Political Party of Radicals (PPR) and from 1990 as a member of GreenLeft. He became the Parliamentary leader of GreenLeft in the House of Representatives and the Leader of GreenLeft on 21 April 1993 after the resignation of Ria Beckers.

Biography

Early life
Petrus Antonius Lankhorst was born on 1 January 1947 in Zwolle in the Netherlands Province of Overijssel in a Roman Catholic family. He attended a Protestant-Christian special schools in Meppel and Deventer, and the Roman Catholic Geert Groote College in Deventer. He started to attend Gymnasium (school) but later went to the HBS, graduating in 1966. He studied political science at the University of Amsterdam, graduating in 1974.

Politics
Lankhorst joined the Political Party of Radicals and entered the Amsterdam city council. He was originally candidate-alderman for education, but Roel van Duijn took this position for the PPR. Lankhorst left the council in 1980. A month later he became civil servant for the municipal department for Youth and Education. After the 1981 election he became MP for the PPR. He was spokesperson on housing, education, Transport, Public Works and Water Management and youth welfare. He was one of the first MPs to be openly homosexual during his term in parliament.

After the 1982 election his former friend Hans Janmaat became MP for the right-wing Centre Party. Lankhorst tried to avoid Janmaat as far as possible. In 1989 Lankhorst initiated a law to oblige high schools to promulgate a statute which lays down the rights of students. In 1993 it was adopted. 

In 1991 the PPR merged with the communist Communist Party of the Netherlands, the left-socialist Pacifist Socialist Party and the Christian left Evangelical People's Party. Lankhorst continued his membership of the Tweede Kamer under the new formation. When Ria Beckers left the parliament in 1993 in order to make room for a new political leader, which would lead the party in the 1994 election, Lankhorst took over the position of chair of the parliamentary party ad interim. He would not stand for re-election in the 1994 election.

In 1994 Lankhorst became a Knight in the Order of the Netherlands Lion. After leaving parliament Lankhorst became an alderman in the submunicipality Bos en Lommer in Amsterdam. He left the position 1998 to become an independent advisor on youth policy.

Decorations

References

External links

Official
  Drs. P.A. (Peter) Lankhorst Parlement & Politiek

 
 

 

1947 births
Living people
Dutch columnists
Dutch nonprofit directors
Dutch political consultants
Dutch political writers
Gay politicians
Dutch gay writers
GroenLinks politicians
Knights of the Order of the Netherlands Lion
Leaders of GroenLinks
LGBT members of the Parliament of the Netherlands
LGBT Roman Catholics
Members of the House of Representatives (Netherlands)
Municipal councillors of Amsterdam
People from Zwolle
Political Party of Radicals politicians
University of Amsterdam alumni
Writers from Amsterdam
20th-century Dutch male writers
20th-century Dutch politicians
21st-century Dutch male writers